Skyline View is an unincorporated community and census-designated place (CDP) in West Hanover Township, Dauphin County, Pennsylvania, United States. The population was 4,003 at the 2010 census, up from 2,307 at the 2000 census. It is part of the Harrisburg–Carlisle Metropolitan Statistical Area.

Geography
Skyline View is located in southern West Hanover Township at  (40.336439, -76.722848). Its northern border follows Interstate 81, and its eastern border follows Pennsylvania Route 39. U.S. Route 22 (Allentown Boulevard) runs through the center of the community, leading east  to Allentown and west  to downtown Harrisburg. PA 39 leads south  to Hershey.

Demographics
As of the census of 2000, there were 2,307 people, 865 households, and 703 families residing in the CDP. The population density was 867.7 people per square mile (334.9/km). There were 890 housing units at an average density of 334.8/sq mi (129.2/km). The racial makeup of the CDP was 97.01% White, 1.08% African American, 1.30% Asian, 0.04% Pacific Islander, 0.09% from other races, and 0.48% from two or more races. Hispanic or Latino of any race were 0.61% of the population.

There were 865 households, out of which 28.9% had children under the age of 18 living with them, 72.0% were married couples living together, 6.7% had a female householder with no husband present, and 18.7% were non-families. 15.8% of all households were made up of individuals, and 6.9% had someone living alone who was 65 years of age or older. The average household size was 2.67 and the average family size was 2.95.

In the CDP, the population was spread out, with 22.6% under the age of 18, 5.5% from 18 to 24, 27.2% from 25 to 44, 30.8% from 45 to 64, and 13.9% who were 65 years of age or older. The median age was 42 years. For every 100 females, there were 100.1 males. For every 100 females age 18 and over, there were 94.7 males.

The median income for a household in the CDP was $54,853, and the median income for a family was $61,439. Males had a median income of $40,216 versus $35,708 for females. The per capita income for the CDP was $23,418. About 1.2% of families and 2.4% of the population were below the poverty line, including none of those under age 18 and 6.5% of those age 65 or over.

References

Harrisburg–Carlisle metropolitan statistical area
Census-designated places in Dauphin County, Pennsylvania
Census-designated places in Pennsylvania